Nicolas Courjal (born 18 January 1973) is a French operatic bass.

Life 
In 1995, he entered Jane Berbié's singing class. He then performed at the Opéra-Comique and the Hessisches Staatstheater Wiesbaden (Germany).

Since 1999, Nicolas Courjal has performed in many French opera houses such as those of Toulouse, Montpellier, Rennes, Avignon, Toulon, Nice, Tours, Vichy as well as at the Chorégies d'Orange, the Théâtre du Châtelet and also at the Opéra Bastille. Abroad, he has performed in La Fenice in Venice and at the Royal Opera House in London, among others.

Courjal received the Arnhold Prize at the Wexford Festival Opera for his role in Massenet's Sapho.

Selected recordings

 Hector Berlioz, Les Troyens, Joyce DiDonato- Didon, Marie-Nicole Lemieux- Cassandre, Stéphane Degout- Chorèbe, Michael Spyres- Enée, Cyrille Dubois- Iopas, Mariane Crebassa- Ascagne, Nicolas Courjal- Narbal, Les Chœurs de l'Opéra National du Rhin, Badischer Staatsopernchor, Orchestre philharmonique de Strasbourg, conducted by John Nelson. 4 CD + 1 DVD Warner 2017. Diapason d'or, Choc de Classica.
 Hector Berlioz, La Damnation de Faust, Michael Spyres- Faust, Joyce DiDonato- Marguerite, Nicolas Courjal- Méphistophélès, Alexandre Duhamel- Brander, Les Petits Chanteurs de Strasbourg, Maîtrise de l'Opéra national du Rhin, Orchestre philharmonique de Strasbourg, conducted by John Nelson. 2 CD + 1 DVD Warner classics 2019. Diapason d'or.

References

External links 
 Official website
 Nicolas Courjal: Je suis un bosseur pas téméraire on Forum Opera
 Nicolas Courjal on Opera on line
 Nicolas Courjal on MusicaGlotz
 Nicolas Courjal on Operabase
 Nicolas Courjal: J’aimerais bien chanter Don Giovanni mais on ne me le demande pas on Forum opera
 Découvrez Nicolas Courjal, ce chanteur à la voix puissante et sublime on RTL
 Nicolas Courjal on Radio Classique
  Nicolas Courjal on Royal Opera House
 Mozart - La Flûte enchantée : O Osis Und Osiris (Courjal / Choir) 2017 (YouTube)

1973 births
Living people
Musicians from Rennes
21st-century French male opera singers
French basses
Operatic basses